821 Fanny (prov. designation:  or ) is a dark background asteroid and slow rotator from the central regions of the asteroid belt. It was discovered on 31 March 1916, by German astronomer Max Wolf at the Heidelberg-Königstuhl State Observatory in southwest Germany. Any reference of the asteroid's name to a person is unknown.

Orbit and classification 

Fanny is a non-family asteroid of the main belt's background population when applying the hierarchical clustering method to its proper orbital elements. It orbits the Sun in the central asteroid belt at a distance of 2.2–3.4 AU once every 4 years and 7 months (1,686 days; semi-major axis of 2.77 AU). Its orbit has an eccentricity of 0.21 and an inclination of 5° with respect to the ecliptic. The body's observation arc begins at the Heidelberg Observatory on 1 April 1916, with its first recorded observation, the night after its official discovery.

Naming 

Any reference of this minor planet name to a person or occurrence is unknown.

Unknown meaning 

Among the many thousands of named minor planets, Fanny is one of 120 asteroids for which no official naming citation has been published. All of these asteroids have low numbers, the first being . They were discovered between 1876 and the 1930s, predominantly by astronomers Auguste Charlois, Johann Palisa, Max Wolf and Karl Reinmuth.

Physical characteristics 

In the Tholen classification and in the SDSS-based taxonomy, Fanny is a common, carbonaceous C-type asteroid. In the Bus–Binzel SMASS classification, it is a hydrated carbonaceous Ch-subtype.

Rotation period 

In 2018, from April to June, a rotational lightcurve of Fanny was obtained from photometric observations over 46 nights by Frederick Pilcher at the Organ Mesa Observatory  in New Mexico. Analysis gave a bimodal lightcurve with a rotation period of  hours and a brightness variation of  magnitude. This determination was adopted by the Lightcurve Data base and accounts for Pilcher's observations taken between April and May. For observations taken between May and June, a similar period of  hours with a somewhat higher amplitude of  magnitude was derived. The observer also ruled out non-principal axis rotation ("tumblin"), and considers a double period 470 hours as very unlikely. This makes it a slow rotator, as most asteroids have much shorter periods between 2 and 20 hours. , Fanny ranks among the 250th slowest rotator known to exist.

During the same apparition, Tom Polakis at the Command Module Observatory  in Arizona obtained a somewhat longer period of  hours with a brightness variation of  magnitude. The result supersedes an incorrect period of  hours with an amplitude of  magnitude from a tentative one-night observation by French amateur astronomers Paul Krafft, Olivier Gerteis, Hubert Gully, Luc Arnold and Matthieu Bachschmidt from 2013.

Diameter and albedo 

The Collaborative Asteroid Lightcurve Link assumes a standard albedo for a carbonaceous C-type asteroid of 0.057 and calculates a diameter of 23.86 kilometers based on an absolute magnitude of 11.84.

Notes

References

External links 
 Lightcurve Database Query (LCDB), at www.minorplanet.info
 Dictionary of Minor Planet Names, Google books
 Asteroids and comets rotation curves, CdR – Geneva Observatory, Raoul Behrend
 Discovery Circumstances: Numbered Minor Planets (1)-(5000) – Minor Planet Center
 
 

000821
Discoveries by Max Wolf
Named minor planets
000821
000821
19160331